Artem Yuriyovych Shcherbak (born 3 September 1996) is a Ukrainian football player. Following the annexation of Crimea by Russia in 2014, he also acquired Russian citizenship as Artyom Yuryevich Shcherbak.

Club career
On 7 February 2019, he signed a 1.5-year contract with the Russian Football National League club FC Tyumen.

He made his debut in the FNL for Tyumen on 3 March 2019 in a game against FC Sibir Novosibirsk, as a 56th minute substitute for Maksim Votinov.

References

External links
 
 Profile at Crimean Football Union
 Profile by Russian Football National League

1996 births
People from Kerch
Living people
Ukrainian footballers
Russian footballers
Association football forwards
FC Metalurh Donetsk players
FC Tyumen players
FC Okean Kerch players
FC Yevpatoriya players
Russian First League players
Crimean Premier League players
FC Olimp-Dolgoprudny players